William Henry Oldfield (1881 in Sowerby Bridge – 1961) was a British Labour Member of Parliament (MP) and a trade unionist.

A cotton operative himself, Oldfield served as Secretary of the Cotton Trades and Labour Council and President of the Cotton Spinners' Association. He was a Manchester City Councillor 1928-1945 and Alderman 1945–61.

The Labour Agent for Gorton, he was selected to fight the Manchester constituency in a wartime by-election in 1942, following the elevation of William Wedgwood Benn to the peerage. He was elected unopposed and held the seat until 1955.

Notes

References 

1881 births
1961 deaths
Labour Party (UK) MPs for English constituencies
English trade unionists
Councillors in Manchester
Transport and General Workers' Union-sponsored MPs
UK MPs 1935–1945
UK MPs 1945–1950
UK MPs 1950–1951
UK MPs 1951–1955